The Pietà (meaning "pity", "compassion") is a subject in Christian art depicting the Blessed Virgin Mary cradling the mortal body of Jesus Christ after his Descent from the Cross. It is most often found in sculpture. The Pietà is a specific form of the Lamentation of Christ in which Jesus is mourned by sole privilege of the Virgin Mary alone, whilst representing her "sixth sorrow" and sometimes accompanied by a specific Marian title.

Accordingly, several of such images have merited a Pontifical decree of Canonical coronation from a Pope, such as but not limited to, the Pieta of Saint Peter’s Basilica in Rome, Marienthal Basilica in France, the image in Church of Franciscans in Leuven, Belgium, Kamp-Bornhofen, Germany and Our Lady of Charity in Cartagena, Spain, et cetera.

Context and development

Pietà is one of the three common artistic representations of a sorrowful Virgin Mary, the other two being Mater Dolorosa (The Dolorous Mother) and Stabat Mater (The Standing Mother). The other two representations are most commonly found in paintings, rather than sculpture, although combined forms exist.

The Pietà developed in Germany (where it is called the "Vesperbild") about 1300, reached Italy about 1400, and was especially popular in Central European Andachtsbilder. Many German and Polish 15th-century examples in wood greatly emphasise Christ's wounds. The Deposition of Christ and the Lamentation or Pietà form the 13th of the Stations of the Cross, as well as one of the Seven Sorrows of the Virgin.

Although the Pietà most often shows the Virgin Mary holding Jesus, there are other compositions, including those where God the Father participates in holding Jesus (see gallery below). In Spain the Virgin often holds up one or both hands, sometimes with Christ's body slumped to the floor.

Michelangelo Buonarroti 

A famous example by Italian sculptor Michelangelo Buonarroti was carved from a block of marble and is located in Saint Peter's Basilica in the Vatican City. The body of Christ is different from most earlier Pietà statues, which were usually smaller and in wood. The Virgin is also unusually youthful, and in repose, rather than the older, sorrowing Mary of most Pietàs. She is shown as youthful for two reasons; God is the source of all beauty and she is one of the closest to God, also the exterior is thought as the revelation of the interior (the virgin is morally beautiful). Michelangelo's Pieta sculpture is also unique in the fact that it is the only one of his works that he ever signed. Upon hearing that visitors thought it had been sculpted by Cristoforo Solari, a competitor. His signature is carved as MICHAELA[N]GELUS BONAROTUS FLORENTIN[US] FACIEBA[T] "Michelangelo Buonarroti the Florentine did it".

In a lesser known Michelangelo Pietà, The Deposition (circa 1547–1555), it is not the Virgin Mary who is holding Jesus' body, but rather Nicodemus (or possibly Joseph of Arimathea), Mary Magdalene, and the Virgin Mary. There is some indication that the man in the hood is based on a self-portrait of the artist. The sculpture is housed in the Museo dell'Opera del Duomo in Florence and is also known as the Florentine Pietà.

A generation later, the Spanish painter Luis de Morales painted a number of highly emotional Pietàs, with examples in the Louvre and Museo del Prado.

Gallery

Statues, statuettes and paintings

See also
 List of statues of Jesus
 Pietà (Michelangelo)
 Replicas of Michelangelo's Pietà

References

Further reading

External links

 Data collection of the image type Pietà in sculpture
 3D model of a detail of Mary from a cast made by the Metropolitan Museum of Art for the Vatican Museums, via photogrammetric survey
 Poem by Moez Surani proposing nine new sculptural Pietas

 
Christian terminology
Italian words and phrases
Descent from the Cross